Sibu Airport  is an airport located  east south east of Sibu, a town in the state of Sarawak in Malaysia. In 2018, the airport handled 1,579,528 passengers on 20,869 flights and also handled 1,443 metric tonnes of cargo. The airport is the 11th busiest airport in Malaysia, and the 3rd busiest in Sarawak in terms of passengers handled.

In April 2009, the airport was given RM 150 million for an upgrade of the terminal building. On 23 September 2010, Sarawak Minister of Finance and Public Health, Dato' Sri Wong Soon Koh had announced that the expansion project would commence.

The upgraded terminal started its operation on 31 July 2012. The airport terminal is the third largest airport terminal in Sarawak after Kuching International Airport and Miri Airport, with a total terminal floor space of 15,240m².

History

1952-1994

The first airport in Sibu was built in Teku, during World War II by the Japanese as a basic air strip. However, the airstrip was heavily bombed by Allied Forces. Reconstruction work on the airport began in 1951. Initially, the runway was constructed at 3,600 feet by 150 feet. First plane landed at the airport on 21 May 1952. The airport opened to regular service on 1 July 1952. Malayan Airways did transit flights from Singapore to Kuching, Sibu and stop at Labuan on every Tuesdays. This was followed by transit flights of the same aircraft follow the same route back to Singapore on the next day. Another flight was operated by Douglas Dakota from Singapore to Kuching, Sibu, and stopped at North Borneo on Fridays. The same flight would follow the same route back to Singapore on the next day. The runway was extended to 4,500 feet by 150 feet in 1959.

On 15 August 1990, a Lockheed C-130H Hercules belonging to the Royal Malaysian Air Force skidded off the runway and the aircraft had been written off. It was believed that those on board are part of the royal entourage visit to Sibu.

On 2 September 1992, a Fokker 50 aircraft landing gear failed, causing the aircraft to veer off the runway and into the bushes.

The old airport has been demolished to make way for Laila Taib College (formerly known as UCS-United College of Sarawak) and Tun Zaidi Stadium. The runway of the old airport can still be seen and half of it is used as the connecting road for the stadium.

1994-2010

Operation of the new airport officially began on 1 June 1994. The airport is located at 23 km away from the town of Sibu. On 31 May 1994, four Malaysia Airlines aircraft performed inaugural landings. The aircraft were three Fokker 50 and a Boeing 737. The airport was built with a single runway, designated as Runway 13/Runway 31. The runway at that time measured . Runway 13 was equipped with approach lighting system known as "Precision Approach Lighting Category 1", while Runway 31 was equipped with "Simple Approach Lighting System". Airside areas such as taxiways and airport apron are also equipped with lightning systems. The maximum capacity of the parking apron was one Airbus, two Boeing 737-400s, two Fokker 50 and two Twin Otter or similar aircraft. Only Bay 2 and 3 were equipped with aerobridges.

The runway was later extended to 2,745 metres and commissioned for use on 9 May 2006 to accommodate the landing of Airbus.

2010-present

In September 2010, an expansion project was underway to upgrade the terminal building and car park with the addition of more aerobridges. This upgrade increases the capacity of the airport into handling 1.9 million passengers annually. The cost of the upgrade was RM130 million. Brand new check-in counters of the airport were opened on 19 December 2011. The upgraded Sibu Airport was inaugurated on 16 September 2012.

On 29 September 2014, a Singaporean training aircraft Beechcraft King Air C90B skidded off the runway during touchdown. No one was injured during the incident.
On 8 April 2017, Malaysia Airlines Flight 2718, operated by Boeing 737-800 9M-MXX, overran the runway on landing. The nose gear collapsed. All 67 people on board survived. The incident resulted in Sibu Airport closure until 10 April, and left 1,413 passengers were affected cancellations and delays of flights. The airport was closed on 13 August 2019 to repair faulty lights on the runway. A total of 12 flights operated by MASwings and AirAsia were cancelled. The airport resumed normal operation on the next day.

Airlines and destinations

Passenger

Cargo

Traffic and statistics

Traffic

Statistics

References

External links

 
 

Airports in Sarawak
Airports established in 1994
Sibu
1994 establishments in Malaysia